Nuculana tenuisulcata, or the Sulcate nut clam, is a marine bivalve mollusc in the family Nuculanidae. It can be found along the Atlantic coast of North America, ranging from the Gulf of St. Lawrence to Rhode Island.

References

Nuculanidae
Bivalves described in 1838